Daramdin is a village located, near Soreng city in Soreng district, Sikkim, India. Daramdin is located, near Soreng, Dentam, Kaluk and Gyalshing. Daramdin was ruled by a feudal king Na Hang in the 1st century. This place mostly comprises Limbu and Lepchas. other communities like Pradhans, Chettris and Bhujels are also there in small numbers.

Tourism 
The main tourist attraction of Daramdin is Sri Sathya Sai Sarva Dharma Kendra Daramdin which is located in its centre. A foundation of a traditional spot, Swarga Janae Seeri (Stairway to heaven) was also laid in 1997. The construction was stopped but now it has been resumed and it is about to get completed.

Education 
Kripasalyan government secondary school is situated near Daramdin Bazar.

References

Villages in Gyalshing district